This list contains an incomplete enumeration of Czech bands, not including classical ensembles.

A
 Abraxas
 Alia Tempora
 Arakain
 Ars Rediviva
 Asonance
 Autopsia

B
 Banjo Band
 Blue Effect
 Bluesquare
 Boni Pueri, the Czech Boys Choir
 Brontosauři
 Brutus
 Buty

C
 Carnal Diafragma
 Cartonnage
 Čechomor
 Chaozz
 Charlie Straight
 Chinaski
 Citron
 Clarinet Factory
 Clou

D
 The Desperate Mind
 DG 307
 Diamond Cats
 Divokej Bill
 Doctor Victor
 Druhá Tráva
 Dunaj
 DVA

E
 E
 The Ecstasy of Saint Theresa
 E!E
 Energit
 Etc

F
 Flamengo
 Forgotten Silence
 FPB
 Framus Five

G
 Garage
 George & Beatovens
 Gipsy.cz

H
 Hudba Praha
 Hypnos

J
 Jasná Páka
 Jazz Q

K
 Kabát
 Krabathor
 Kreyson
 Krucipüsk
 Kryštof

L
 Lake Malawi
 Laura a její tygři
 Life After Life
 Lucie
 Luno

M
 Malignant Tumour
 Mandrage
 Marsyas
 Master 
 Masterpiece
 Master's Hammer
 The Matadors
 Maxim Turbulenc
 Midi lidi
 Miou Miou
 Mňága a Žďorp
 Monkey Business
 Musica Florea

N
 Naše Věc

O
 Oceán
 Olympic
 Ondřej Havelka and his Melody Makers
 Original Prague Syncopated Orchestra

P
 Patrola Šlapeto
 Pink Angels
 Pipes and Pints
 The Plastic People of the Universe
 Poitín
 Poutníci
 Prago Union
 Pražský výběr
 Priessnitz
 The Primitives Group
 Progres 2
 The Prostitutes
 Psí vojáci
 Public Relations
 Půlnoc
 Pusa

R
 Rangers
 Root

S
 The Sads
 Salamandra
 Sebastien
 Shalom
 Silent Stream of Godless Elegy
 Slza
 Spirituál kvintet
 Sto zvířat
 Support Lesbiens

T
 Tata Bojs
 Tichá dohoda
 Törr
 The Tower of Dudes
 Toxique
 Toyen
 Trollech
 Tři sestry
 Turbo

U
 Umbrtka
 Už jsme doma

V
 Verona
 Visací zámek
 Vitacit

W
 Wanastowi Vjecy
 We Are Domi
 Wohnout

X
 XIII. Století

Y
 Yellow Sisters
 Yo Yo Band

Z
 Žentour
 Žlutý pes
 Zrní
 Zuby Nehty

See also
 List of Czech musicians

Czech